Acacia deficiens is a tree or shrub belonging to the genus Acacia and the subgenus Phyllodineae. It is native to an area in the Great Southern, Goldfields-Esperance and Wheatbelt regions of Western Australia.

It blooms from September to October and produces yellow flowers.

See also
List of Acacia species

References

deficiens
Acacias of Western Australia
Taxa named by Bruce Maslin